The Guwahati Metropolitan Development Authority (GMDA) is a state parastatal agency of the Government of Assam created for the Guwahati metropolitan area. The authority is responsible for planning and development of the metropolitan region and is currently preparing the revised master plan for Guwahati and the building bye-laws. The authority is also responsible for the activities related to building permissions in the city.

References

External links
 Official website of Guwahati Metropolitan Development Authority

Guwahati
State urban development authorities of India
State agencies of Assam
1985 establishments in Assam
Government agencies established in 1985